Borut Justin is a retired Yugoslav slalom canoeist who competed from the late 1950s to the mid-1960s. He won two medals at the ICF Canoe Slalom World Championships with a gold in 1963 (Mixed C-2) and a silver in 1965 (C-2 team).

References
ICF medalists for Olympic and World Championships - Part 2: rest of flatwater (now sprint) and remaining canoeing disciplines: 1936-2007.

Possibly living people
Year of birth missing (living people)
Yugoslav male canoeists
Medalists at the ICF Canoe Slalom World Championships